Fußballclub Dornbirn 1913 is a professional association football club based in the town of Dornbirn, Vorarlberg, Austria, that competes in the Austrian Football Second League, the second tier of the Austrian football league system. Founded in 1913, it is affiliated to the Vorarlberg Football Association. The team plays its home matches at Stadion Birkenwiese, where it has been based since 2019.

History
FC Dornbirn was founded on 12 March 1913 at a founding meeting in the Dornbirn Gasthaus zur Flur. The club colours were decided to be red, white and black which later changed to white and red. The city coat of arms of Dornbirn was already used as the logo in the founding year.

The club would reach the highest tier of Austrian football for the last time in the 1969–70 season, but mostly competed in the second tier of the Austrian football league system. Dornbirn has never won a major national title, but the club has been able to secure the title of Vorarlberg champion ten times and become Vorarlberg Cup winners six times.

In 1966, FC Dornbirn entered into a cooperation with Austria Lustenau, which was dissolved again after a relatively unsuccessful season. In 1979, the club merged with Schwarz-Weiß Bregenz. Under the name IG Bregenz/Dornbirn they played for years in the second division and also provided a unique curiosity in Austrian professional football. When the club had to be relegated to the Austrian Regionalliga West in the 1984–85 season due to a league reform, the second team of IG Bregenz/Dornbirn, which consisted of only amateurs, managed to qualify for the second division in the same season. Thus– "strengthened" with some of their better amateur players, the united Dornbirner/Bregenz football professionals were also able to compete in the second level of the 1985–86 season. In 1987, the "community of interests" was dissolved and the two traditional associations were re-founded.

In 1988–89 Dornbirn were promoted back to the second tier, but were relegated to the Regionalliga after the end of the season. From 2005–06 to 2008–09 FC Dornbirn played in the Regionalliga West, the third tier in Austrian football.

In the 2008–09 season, the team won the championship in the Regionalliga West and promoted to the second tier, now renamed First League. However, Dornbirn were relegated from the First League after just one season; after a 8–1 loss against Admira Wacker which included a hat-trick by Martin Pušić, the club found themselves in last place with only two more games to play. At that time, the Vorarlberg-based club had also been denied a licence for a spot in the First League after two appeals. Although FC Dornbirn would still have had a chance of securing their status as a First League club through relegation play-offs even as bottom in the table, hope was abandoned when there was no relegation from the Bundesliga to the First League. As Austria Kärnten had been denied the First League licence, FC Dornbirn waived the go to the Permanent Neutral Arbitration Court, the last instance in licensing matters, and returned to the Regionalliga West without a chance to compete for survival through the play-offs.

On 4 August 2010, bankruptcy proceedings were opened against FC Dornbirn before the Feldkirch Regional Court in response to a bankruptcy petition it had filed.

In the 2018–19 season, FC Dornbirn won promotion back to the second division after a nine-year absence.

Current squad

Out on loan

Honours

League
 Austrian Regionalliga West
 Champions (2): 2008–09, 2018–19
 Vorarlberg Championship
 Champions (10): 1954–55, 1959–60, 1962–63, 1969–70, 1973–1974, 1974–75, 1984–85, 1987–88, 1996–97, 2003–04

Cup
 
 Winners (12): 1933, 1937, 1952, 1959, 1981, 1982, 2011, 2012, 2014, 2015, 2016, 2019
 Runners-up (3): 1949, 1958, 1997

References

External links
  
 FC Dornbirn 1913 at the Austrian Football Association 

Football clubs in Austria
Association football clubs established in 1913
1913 establishments in Austria
Dornbirn